WKHC is a contemporary Christian radio station at 97.1 FM licensed to Hatteras, North Carolina serving the Outer Banks of North Carolina. The station is owned by EMF Broadcasting.

History
WKHC started in 1989 as soft adult contemporary "The Wind 97.1", WYND-FM. In 2000, the station became Country WNHW. In 2003, Soft AC WYND-FM returned to 97.1. In 2006, Convergent Broadcasting LLC sold WYND-FM, WFMZ, WVOD and WZPR to CapSan Media LLC. On October 31, 2006 at Noon, WYND-FM and WZPR both dropped Soft AC for Country later branded as "Wilbur 92.3 & Orville 97.1".

In late 2002, Convergent had purchased these two stations from OBX Broadcasting. In April 2006, CapSan Media announced it had signed an Asset Purchase Agreement to purchase WZPR/WYND-FM along with sister stations WVOD and WFMZ from Convergent Broadcasting, LLC. On July 6, 2006, CapSan Media completed the purchase of all four stations.

On March 13, 2008, Capsan Media ended its Country simulcast and flipped the 92.3 frequency to sports as "ESPN 92.3." and WYND-FM became Your Country 97.1.

On May 11, 2009, WYND-FM changed their format to sports as sister station WZPR was simulcasting WFMZ 104.9 FM.

Hengooch, LLC bought WYND-FM, WVOD, and WZPR/WFMZ in 2010 for $200,000. Hengooch sold WYND-FM to EMF Broadcasting for $1 effective September 1, 2013. On September 1, 2013, WYND-FM changed their format to EMF's K-Love contemporary Christian format.

On February 5, 2019, the station changed its call sign to WKHC.

Previous logo
 (Former simulcast WZPR's logo)

References

VARTV

External links

Radio stations established in 1996
K-Love radio stations
1996 establishments in North Carolina
Educational Media Foundation radio stations
KHC